Clifton Alapa is a former Canadian Football League defensive lineman and Grey Cup champion.

Alapa was born in Kahuku, Hawaii, the hometown of CFL all-star Junior Ah You. They are both of Samoan descent, went to the same university and were friends when they played together in Montreal.

Alapa joined the Montreal Alouettes in 1977, playing 12 games and was part of their Grey Cup championship. He played 10 more games for the Larks in 1978, joining the Hamilton Tiger-Cats for the last 4 games of the 1978 season. He made a comeback in 1983 with the Los Angeles Express of the USFL, registering 1.5 sacks.

References

External links
CFLAPEDIA BIO
CAREER STATS

1954 births
Living people
American sportspeople of Samoan descent
Arizona State Sun Devils football players
Hamilton Tiger-Cats players
Los Angeles Express players
Montreal Alouettes players
People from Oahu
Players of American football from Hawaii